

2000s

References

External links
FIFA.com
World Football Elo Ratings: Jordan

Resuluts